Attilio Viviani (born 18 October 1996 in Oppeano) is an Italian cyclist, who currently rides for UCI ProTeam . He is the younger brother of professional cyclist Elia Viviani, who currently rides for UCI WorldTeam .

Major results
2013
 6th GP Dell'Arno
2019
 1st Schaal Sels
2020
 1st Stage 1 La Tropicale Amissa Bongo

Grand Tour general classification results timeline

References

External links

Italian male cyclists
1996 births
Living people
Cyclists from the Province of Verona
21st-century Italian people